The following page lists power stations in Djibouti.

Wind

See also 

Energy in Djibouti
 List of largest power stations in the world
 List of power stations in Africa

References

External links
Approximate Location of Ghoubet Wind Power Station 

Djibouti
 
Power stations